Katherine Anne Alano is a Filipino-British model, actress and television presenter/VJ in the Philippines.

Early life
Kat Alano was born to an English mother and a Filipino father. She was educated at Gresham's School, Norfolk, England, and at the German Swiss International School, Hong Kong. She was born in Birmingham, England, then later moved to Hong Kong.

Career
Before becoming famous, Alano performed in theatre in England, including William Shakespeare plays and West Side Story. When she came to the Philippines, she started her modeling career and competed in the Miss Batangas competition in 2004, winning the title. That same year, she won the Studio 23 VJ Hunt along with Beau Canlas, Ayanna Oliva and Juddha Paolo. After that stint, she became one of the first official co-hosts of the variety show Wowowee. She later joined Studio 23's show E-Club. After winning the MTV VJ Hunt in June 2007, she was a VJ for MTV Philippines, as well as being the host for Cinema One's VIP Pass. She also hosted QTV 11's Fit & Fab in season two partnered with fellow MTV VJ Maggie Wilson.

After a brief hiatus in the UK, she co-hosted the morning show The KC Show with Kat on Wave 891 alongside KC Montero. She is now working on her musical endeavors, having already collaborated with SNRG on several tracks, she is now the Singer/Songwriter for Alikat, (https://soundcloud.com/alikat-music) as well as hosting her own podcast show on nmfnetwork.tv with Basti Artadi and Sib Sibulo called That Show.

In 2015, Kat launched her company, Diwata Yoga Mats, (https://lovediwata.com/). Her purpose with Diwata was to bring inspiration through art she created around the world.

Filmography

References

Notes

External links
 
 Pictures at celebgallery.us
 
Kat Alano on Instagram 
Kat Alano Music on SoundCloud
DIWATA yoga mat company 

1985 births
Filipino female models
Filipino film actresses
Filipino television actresses
People educated at Gresham's School
VJs (media personalities)
Star Magic personalities
British emigrants to the Philippines
Filipino people of English descent
English people of Filipino descent
People from Birmingham, West Midlands
Living people
21st-century Filipino actresses
Filipino radio personalities